Čalma is a village located in the Sremska Mitrovica municipality, in the Syrmia District of Vojvodina, Serbia. It is situated in the autonomous province of Vojvodina. The village has a Serb ethnic majority and its population numbering 1,675 people (2002 census).

Name
In Serbian, the village is known as Čalma (Чалма), in Croatian as Čalma, in Hungarian as Csalma, and in German as Tschalma.

Demographics

Ethnic groups (2002 census):
Serbs = 1,634 (97.55%)
Croats = 14 (0.84%)
others.

The ethnic Germans consisted half of the village population before The Second World War.

Historical population

1961: 1,704
1971: 1,787
1981: 1,855
1991: 1,776
2002: 1,675

See also
List of places in Serbia
List of cities, towns and villages in Vojvodina

References
Slobodan Ćurčić, Broj stanovnika Vojvodine, Novi Sad, 1996.

Populated places in Syrmia
Sremska Mitrovica